Bank of America Tower (originally Barnett Center) is a skyscraper in the downtown area of Jacksonville, Florida, at the northwest corner of Bay and Laura streets. At , it is the tallest building in Jacksonville, and the seventeenth-tallest in Florida (the tallest ten all being in Miami). It was built as the headquarters of Barnett Bank and originally named Barnett Center, but the name was changed to NationsBank Tower in 1998 after Barnett Bank was acquired by NationsBank. NationsBank was soon acquired by Bank of America and the building's name was changed to Bank of America Tower in 1999. The 42-floor structure was designed by German-American architect Helmut Jahn, and is constructed of reinforced concrete.

Gallery

See also

Architecture of Jacksonville
List of tallest buildings in Jacksonville

References

 
 
 "Bank of America Tower", Emporis.com

Bank of America buildings
Skyscraper office buildings in Jacksonville, Florida
Postmodern architecture in Florida
Downtown Jacksonville
Northbank, Jacksonville
Architecture in Jacksonville, Florida
Laura Street
Helmut Jahn buildings
Office buildings completed in 1990
1990 establishments in Florida